Julius Heinrich Ahrens (14 July 1808 – 2 August 1874) was a German philosopher and jurist.

Works
Cours de droit naturel. Paris 1839
Staatslehre Organische Philosophisch-anthropologischer auf Grundlage. Vienna 1850, his unfinished masterpiece
Fichte 's politische in ihrer wissenschaftlichen Lehre, culturgeschichtlichen allgemeinen Nationalen und Bedeutung: Festrede zur Fichtefeier an der Universität Leipzig . *Veit, Leipzig 1862 ( online at Düsseldorf University and Library )
Naturrecht Das oder nach dem die Rechtsphilosophie gegenwärtigen Zustand dieser Wissenschaft in Deutschland. 6th ed. Vienna from 1870 to 1871 (2 vols.)
Juristische Encyklopädie. Vienna. 1855-57 (organic representation of law and political science)
From confoederatione Germanicae. Göttingen 1830

German philosophers
Jurists from Frankfurt
1808 births
1874 deaths
German male writers
19th-century German jurists
Members of the Frankfurt Parliament